Area codes 248 and 947 are area codes in the North American Numbering Plan (NANP) for Oakland County in the U.S. state of Michigan. The area codes also serve portions of Livonia and Northville, both located in Wayne County. The rest of Wayne County, including Detroit, located to the southeast, is serviced by area codes 313 and 734.

Area code 248 was created in 1997 as a split from area code 810. In 2000, area code 947 was assigned as a relief area code for the area. In 2001, it was approved as an all-services overlay plan in the 248 numbering plan area, requiring ten-digit dialing after end of the permissive dialing period, which started on January 26, 2002.

Major communities serviced include:

Addison Township (shared with 586 and 810)
Auburn Hills
Berkley
Birmingham
Bloomfield Hills
Bloomfield Township
Brighton
Clarkston
Clawson
Commerce Township
Farmington Hills, Michigan
Ferndale, Michigan
Hazel Park, Michigan
Holly, Michigan (part by 810)
Huntington Woods, Michigan
Lake Orion, Michigan area
Leonard, Michigan (part by 810)
Livonia, Michigan (most by 734, with a very small part by 248)
Madison Heights, Michigan
Milford, Michigan
Northville, Michigan (part)
Novi, Michigan
Oakland Township, Michigan
Oak Park, Michigan
Ortonville, Michigan (part by 810)
Oxford, Michigan (part by 810)
Pontiac, Michigan
Rochester, Michigan
Rochester Hills, Michigan 
Royal Oak, Michigan
Shelby Charter Township, Michigan (most by 586, with a very small part by 248)
Southfield, Michigan
South Lyon, Michigan
Troy, Michigan
Walled Lake, Michigan
Waterford Township, Michigan area
West Bloomfield Township, Michigan
White Lake Township, Michigan area
Wixom, Michigan

References

External links
Map of Michigan area codes at North American Numbering Plan Administration's website
 List of exchanges from AreaCodeDownload.com, 248 Area Code
 List of exchanges from AreaCodeDownload.com, 947 Area Code

Telecommunications-related introductions in 1997
Telecommunications-related introductions in 2002
248
248
1997 establishments in Michigan
2002 establishments in Michigan